Cyprus competed at the 2012 European Athletics Championships held in Helsinki, Finland, between 27 June to 1 July 2012. 10 competitors, 8 men and 2 women took part in 11 events.

Results

Men
Track events

Field events

Women
Track events

Field events

References
 

2012
Nations at the 2012 European Athletics Championships
2012 in Cypriot sport